Dan Mason (born Daniel Grassman; February 9, 1857 – July 6, 1929) was an American actor. He appeared in more than one hundred films from 1913 to 1929. He is remembered as the "Skipper" in the "Toonerville Folks" comedy films.

Selected filmography

References

External links 

1857 births
1929 deaths
American male film actors